Émaux et Camées (Enamels and Cameos) is a collection of poetry by the French poet Théophile Gautier. 

Originally published in 1852 with 18 poems, Émaux et camées  grew to include 37 poems in later editions. Whereas Gautier's earlier work was more concerned with romantic aestheticism, the formalism of this last collection is a point of reference for the arrival of Parnassianism.

Contents
Préface
Affinités secrètes
Le Poème de la Femme
Études de mains
Variations sur le Carnaval de Venise
Symphonie en Blanc Majeur
Coquetterie posthume
Diamant du cœur
Premier Sourire du Printemps
Contralto
Caerulei oculi
Rondalla
L'Aveugle
Lied
Fantaisies d'hiver
La Source
Bûchers et tombeaux
Le Souper des armures
La Montre
Les Nereides
Les Accroche-cœurs
La Rose-thé
Carmen

Noël
Les Joujoux de la morte
Après le feuilleton
Le Château du Souvenir
Camélia et Paquerette
La Fellah
La Mansarde
La Nue
Le Merle
La Fleur qui fait le printemps
Dernier Vœu
Plaintive Tourterelle
La Bonne Soirée
L'Art

External links

  Émaux et Camées at the Société Théophile Gautier website
 English translation at Project Gutenberg
 Enamels and Cameos (2nd "augmented" edition from 1858), translated into unrhymed English, Sunny Lou Publishing, 2022]
Stanzas on Venice are quoted appreciatively in Chapter 14 of 'The Picture of Dorian Gray' (Oscar Wilde)

References

French poetry
Works by Théophile Gautier